Ginestra is an Arbëreshë town and comune in the Province of Potenza, Basilicata, Italy. It is bounded by the comuni of Barile, Forenza, Maschito, Ripacandida, Venosa.

References

Arbëresh settlements
Cities and towns in Basilicata